Danny Raco (born 24 December 1979) is an Italian Australian actor and director, known for his television work.

Raco was born in Rome, Italy.

Career
He got his start playing Marco Vialli on the teenage soap opera Heartbreak High from 1998 to 1999. In 2001, he joined the cast of a primetime soap opera, Home and Away, playing Alex Poulos.

In 2004, Raco chose to leave Home and Away to pursue the role of Constable Joss Peroni on Blue Heelers. He remained with the show until its end in 2006. He returned to Home and Away in June 2007, and is now a director on the series.

Personal life
While on Home and Away, he dated co-stars Tammin Sursok and Ada Nicodemou, who played his sister Leah.

References

External links

1979 births
Living people
Australian male television actors
Italian emigrants to Australia